Theatrix is a role playing game that was produced in 1995 by the now-defunct Backstage Press. It was unusual because, unlike most other role-playing games of the time, it did not use dice to resolve actions or determine success.

Contents
Theatrix comes packaged as a 136-page softcover rule book, and also includes 11 loose-leaf cardstock sheets containing flowcharts for planning adventures and resolving plot points. It was designed and written by David Berkman, Travis Eneix, Andrew Finch, Anthony Gallela and Brett Hackett, with art by Aaron Long.

Gameplay

Character generation
Each character has a number of numerically-rated attributes and skills, as well as non-numerically-rated personality traits, and unrated 'Descriptors'.

Plot Points
Descriptors can be a disadvantage, and when they have a negative effect on a character, the player earns Plot Points. Descriptors can also be used to advantage, but in order to do so, the player must spend Plot Points while invoking a specific Descriptor.

Actors and Directors
Theatrix applies cinematic concepts to role-playing: the players are "Actors" and the GM is the "Director". The Director attempts to frame adventures as if they were screenplays, with a pre-structured plot that consists of a number of agreed-upon acts, scenes, and "pinch-points".

Diceless play
Unlike other role-playing games that use dice to determine success or failure, in Theatrix, when the plot reaches a "pinch point", the referee has already decided if the Actors have done enough to succeed, so dice are not needed. (Dice are only used to resolve a situation in the rare event that the Director cannot decide if the Actors have succeeded or failed.) This was a new concept at the time of the system's release.

While the Actors cannot change the major structure of the plot, they can influence a scene by spending Plot Points, either to guarantee success or to change a plot point in their favor. The example used in the rule book is of a male character with the "Lady's Man" Descriptor who is about to be assaulted and robbed by a femme fatale; the player invokes the "Lady's Man" Descriptor and spends Plot Points in order to transform the scene from a mugging into a romantic liaison.

Distributed directing
The game encourages collaborative roleplaying, using what it calls "Distributed Directing": the players may introduce subplots, although the Director still remains responsible for the overall direction of the main plot.

Reception
In the May 1995 edition of Dragon (Issue 217), Lester Smith approached the game skeptically but admitted after play-testing that "This approach to role-playing may be unusual, but it works. The fact of the matter is, playing the game is fun." He liked the tone of the writing, which he called "applaudable", and found the information and rules well-organized, with "a healthy number of clear examples." Smith also liked that the book "teaches a remarkable amount about scripting stories as if they were dramas. That information alone makes the book a valuable resource for game masters." He does warn prospective referees that getting a campaign started would take extra time because "the initial concepts are so unusual" and the referee has to create all of "the specifics of composing skill lists and definitions, attribute ranges, and so on." Smith concluded by giving it a strong recommendation, saying, "I whole-heartedly recommend it as both an entertaining change from the vagaries of dice and an admirable training course in the creation of dramatic adventures. Were I were to teach a college course in role-playing, this game would be required reading."

Reviews
Rollespilsmagasinet Fønix (Danish) (Issue 9 - August/September 1995)
Shadis #26 (April, 1996)
White Wolf Inphobia #57 (July, 1995)

References

External links 
 Review of the Ironwood supplement by RPG.net
 Review of Theatrix, by John Kim

Role-playing game systems
Universal role-playing games
Role-playing games introduced in 1993